First-seeded John McEnroe was the defending champion and won in the final, which lasted 1h39,  against Jimmy Connors in straight sets 6–1, 6–2, 6–3 .

Seeds
A champion seed is indicated in bold text while text in italics indicates the round in which that seed was eliminated.

  John McEnroe (champion)
  Jimmy Connors (final)
  Jimmy Arias (semifinals)
  Johan Kriek (quarterfinals)

Draw

References

External links
1984 World Championship Tennis Finals Draw

Singles